Viscount Esher, of Esher in the County of Surrey, is a title in the Peerage of the United Kingdom. It was created on 11 November 1897 for the prominent lawyer and judge William Brett, 1st Baron Esher, upon his retirement as Master of the Rolls. He had already been created Baron Esher, of Esher in the County of Surrey, on 24 July 1885, also in the Peerage of the United Kingdom. His son, the second Viscount, was a Liberal politician and historian. His grandson, the fourth Viscount, was a noted architect.  the titles are held by the latter's son, the fifth Viscount, who succeeded in 2004.

The family seat is Beauforest House, near Newington, Oxfordshire.

Viscounts Esher (1897)
 William Baliol Brett, 1st Viscount Esher (1815–1899)
 Reginald Baliol Brett, 2nd Viscount Esher (1852–1930)
 Oliver Sylvain Baliol Brett, 3rd Viscount Esher (1881–1963)
 Lionel Gordon Baliol Brett, 4th Viscount Esher (1913–2004)
 Christopher Lionel Baliol Brett, 5th Viscount Esher (b. 1936)

The heir apparent is the present holder's son Hon. Matthew Christopher Anthony Brett (b. 1963)
The heir apparent's heir apparent is his son Jack Alexander Baliol Brett (b. June 1996)

Arms

References

Sources
 
 Kidd, Charles, Williamson, David (editors). Debrett's Peerage and Baronetage (1990 edition). New York: St Martin's Press, 1990.
 

Viscountcies in the Peerage of the United Kingdom
Noble titles created in 1897
Noble titles created for UK MPs